The 1948 Sabena Douglas DC-4 crash occurred on 12 May 1948 when a Sabena Douglas DC-4 crashed 27 km south of Libenge, Belgian Congo. It was the deadliest accident for Sabena at the time and the second of three deadly Sabena crashes in 1948. It was also the deadliest in Belgian Congo before the country's independence as the Democratic Republic of the Congo in 1960. Of the 32 people on board 31 were killed, leaving only one survivor.

Aircraft
The DC-4-1009 involved was built in 1946 and bought new from Douglas with serial number 42932 and registration OO-CBE and was used by the Belgian airline company Sabena from 17 April 1946 until its destruction in 1948. The aircraft was mostly used in Belgian Congo and carried Regent Prince Charles of Belgium back to Belgium on 13 August 1947 after his official visit to Congo.

Crash 
The Sabena flight departed from Léopoldville-N'Djili Airport en route to Libenge Airport with 25 passengers and seven crew members on board. Mid-flight, the aircraft mysteriously began to lose control, subsequently plummeting into the rainforest at high speeds.

Probable cause
The aircraft was probably then forced to the ground by a downward gust.

The aircraft hit the tree-tops and left a  trail through the forest until it finally crashed, killing all seven crew members and 24 of the 25 passengers. The sole survivor was an Egyptian man.

Aftermath
The wreck was located the following day and the injured sole survivor was rescued. Rescuers searched for more survivors, but it quickly became clear that their efforts were in vain. This crash was the second deadly crash of three involving a Sabena aircraft in 1948.

References

Sabena accidents and incidents
Airliner accidents and incidents caused by weather
Sabena Douglas DC-4 crash
Sabena Douglas DC-4 crash
Sabena Douglas DC-4 crash, 1948
Sabena Douglas DC-4 crash
Accidents and incidents involving the Douglas DC-4